Lloyd "Pepper" Bassett (August 5, 1910 – December 28, 1980) was an American baseball catcher in the Negro leagues and the Mexican League. He played professionally from 1934 to 1954, playing mainly with the Birmingham Black Barons; he was All-Star seven times.

Bassett was 15 years old when began his career in 1934 with the minor league New Orleans Crescent Stars; while playing for New Orleans, he suggested to the team owner that as a stunt to draw a larger audience, he should catch some games while sitting in a rocking chair; the stunt was a success, and he would occasionally resort to that stunt throughout his career.

During the 1944 Negro World Series, Bassett was injured in a car accident, along with Tommy Sampson, John Britton, and Leandy Young.

References

External links
 and Baseball-Reference Black Baseball stats and Seamheads 
NLBPA.com

Baseball players from Louisiana
Mexican League baseball players
Birmingham Black Barons players
Chicago American Giants players
Cincinnati Clowns players
Philadelphia Stars players
Pittsburgh Crawfords players
Homestead Grays players
New Orleans Crescent Stars players
1910 births
1980 deaths
20th-century African-American sportspeople
Baseball catchers